Abdolkarimi may refer to:

 Bijan Abdolkarimi, Iranian philosopher

See also 
 Abdolkarim, a personal name (including a list of people with the name)
 Abdul Rahim Karimi, politician of Afghanistan